Moody may refer to:

Places
 Moody, Alabama, U.S.
 Moody, Indiana, U.S.
 Moody, Missouri, U.S.
 Moody, Texas, U.S.
 Moody County, South Dakota, U.S.
 Port Moody, British Columbia, Canada
 Hundred of Moody, a cadastral division in South Australia
 Moody, South Australia, a locality
 Moody Railway Station
 Moody Tank Conservation Park, a protected area in South Australia

Business
 Moody Bible Institute
 Moody Radio
 Moody Broadcasting Network, based in Chicago, USA
 Moody Publishers, based in Chicago, USA
 Moody Yachts, a British boatbuilder

Other
 Moody (album)
 Moody (crater), an impact crater on Mercury
 Moody (surname), people and characters with the name
 Moody Air Force Base, Lowndes County, USA
 Moody chart, used for computing friction losses in pipes
 Moody Church, based in Chicago, USA
 "Moody", a 1981 song from ESG's ESG EP
 "Moody", a 2006 song from Bitter:Sweet's The Mating Game

See also
Justice Moody (disambiguation)

Moody's (disambiguation)
Moodyz, a Japanese adult video producer